Pella, Burkina Faso is a town in the Pella Department of Boulkiemdé Province in central western Burkina Faso. It is the capital of the Pella Department and has a population of 5,968.

References

External links
Satellite map at Maplandia.com

Populated places in Boulkiemdé Province